Hickory is a town in Murray County, Oklahoma, United States. The population was 87 at the 2000 census.

Hickory was the birthplace and childhood home of Zack Mosley, the creator of the comic strip  The Adventures of Smilin' Jack, an adventurous aviator, inspired by Mosley witnessing an early plane crash in Hickory.

Geography
Hickory is located at  (34.559558, -96.856941).

Demographics

As of the census of 2000, there were 87 people, 32 households, and 24 families residing in the town. There were 40 housing units at an average density of 72.5 per square mile (28.1/km2). The racial makeup of the town was 71.26% White, 12.64% Native American, 1.15% Asian, 9.20% from other races, and 5.75% from two or more races. Hispanic or Latino of any race were 16.09% of the population.

There were 32 households, out of which 34.4% had children under the age of 18 living with them, 68.8% were married couples living together, and 25.0% were non-families. 18.8% of all households were made up of individuals, and 3.1% had someone living alone who was 65 years of age or older. The average household size was 2.72 and the average family size was 3.21.

In the town, the population was spread out, with 31.0% under the age of 18, 10.3% from 18 to 24, 25.3% from 25 to 44, 20.7% from 45 to 64, and 12.6% who were 65 years of age or older. The median age was 36 years. For every 100 females, there were 107.1 males. For every 100 females age 18 and over, there were 130.8 males.

The median income for a household in the town was $21,000, and the median income for a family was $20,893. Males had a median income of $23,125 versus $13,750 for females. The per capita income for the town was $6,932. There were 39.1% of families and 46.0% of the population living below the poverty line, including 65.4% of under eighteens and none of those over 64.

References

External links
 Encyclopedia of Oklahoma History and Culture - Hickory

Towns in Murray County, Oklahoma
Towns in Oklahoma